Infante Antonio Pascual Francisco Javier Juan Nepomuceno Aniello Raimundo Silvestre of Spain (31 December 1755 – 20 April 1817) was a son of King Charles III of Spain and younger brother of King Charles IV of Spain and King Ferdinand I of the Two Sicilies.

Biography

Born in Acquaviva Palace in Caserta, where the royal family lived before the Royal Palace of Caserta was built, he was the fifth son of Charles III of Spain and Maria Amalia of Saxony. A humanist devoted to arts, he bore a striking resemblance to his elder brother Charles IV. At the death of his uncle Ferdinand VI of Spain, who he never met, his parents, brothers Charles and Gabriel, and sisters Maria Luisa and Maria Josefa departed for Spain where his father ruled as Charles III.

Aged 39, he married on August 25, 1795, María Amalia of Spain, 16-year-old daughter of his brother Charles IV in a double wedding where Maria Amalia's younger sister, Maria Luisa married Louis, Duke of Parma. She died 3 years later in childbirth after giving birth to a dead son.

He supported his nephew Prince Ferdinand, Prince of Asturias, and profoundly disliked Manuel Godoy.

He headed the Junta Suprema de Gobierno, in the absence of his brother and nephew, when they tried to humor Napoleon in Bayonne.

During the Peninsular War he lived with the rest of the Royal Family under house arrest at the Château de Valençay. After the war he served in several high functions. He was a fervent supporter of absolutism, organizing support for the restoration of the absolute monarchy.

Arms

Ancestry

References 

1755 births
1817 deaths
Regents of Spain
Spanish infantes
House of Bourbon (Spain)
Knights of the Golden Fleece of Spain
People from Caserta
Burials in the Pantheon of Infantes at El Escorial
Sons of kings